Humayun Khan may refer to:

Khan as surname
 Ala ud-din Sikandar Shah (died 1394), born Hamayun Khan, Sultan of Delhi
 Humayun Khan (diplomat) (1932–2022), Pakistani diplomat
 Humayun Saifullah Khan (born 1943), Pakistani politician
 Humayun Akhtar Khan (born 1955), Pakistani politician
 Humayun Khan (soldier) (1976–2004), Pakistani-American US Army soldier killed in action
 Humayun Khan (politician), Pakistani politician
 Humayun Muhammad Khan, Pakistani politician
 Munawar Humayun Khan (born 1941), Pakistani chair of the Board of Directors of the Sarhad Rural Support Programme

Khan as middle name
 Humayun Khan Bangash, Commander of the IV Corps of the Pakistan Army, 1993–1996
 Humayun Khan Mandokhel (born 1962), Pakistani senator
 Mir Humayun Khan Marri (fl. 1997–2011), Pakistani senator
Humayun Khan Panni, Deputy Speaker of the Jatiyo Sangsad of Bangladesh, 1991–1996